Rock Spectacle is the first live album by Barenaked Ladies. It was also the first major success for the band in the United States, selling over one million copies and producing a hit single in the country in its version of "Brian Wilson." The album was recorded at two concerts: at the Riviera Theatre in Chicago and at The Olympia in Montreal during the Born on a Pirate Ship tour.

A live version of "Shoe Box" was on promotional and advance copies of this record, but was ultimately deleted. The recording would eventually be released on the "One Week" CD single. The album contains two bonus tracks. The first is a banter about an elderly woman Ed Robertson ran into in Chicago. The story is later referenced in "If I Had $1000000". The second is improvised banter about Robertson's Uncle Elwyn.

This disc is an enhanced CD, which means it will display special multimedia features when played on a computer. It includes a program called "BNLTV", a faux collection of various-themed TV programming.

Commercial performance
By July 1998, Rock Spectacle had sold 775,000 copies in the United States and 80,000 copies in Canada. In September 1998, the album was certified Platinum in the United States.

Track listing

Personnel
 Steven Page – vocals, acoustic guitar  (1, 4, 7), electric guitar  (8, 10)
 Ed Robertson – vocals, acoustic guitar  (all except 3 and 8), electric guitar  (3, 8)
 Jim Creeggan – double bass  (all but 4), electric bass  (4), backing vocals  (1, 2, 4, 6, 9, 10, 11)
 Tyler Stewart – drums, backing vocals  (8, 9, 11)
 Kevin Hearn – keyboards  (all but 6), accordion  (2, 6), electric guitar  (on "Uncle Elwyn" adlib), backing vocals  (4, 5, 6, 9, 11)

Production
 Engineers: Marcel Gounin, Michael Phillip Wojewoda
 Assistant engineers: Bernoit Baruvin, Dan Glomski, Mycle Konopka, Timothy R. Powell
 Mixing assistants: Jeff Elliot, Tom Heron
 Mastering: Don C. Tyler
 Digital editing: Jeff Elliot
 Design: Neil Prime
 Photography: Neil Prime

Charts

Weekly charts

Year-end charts

Singles

Certifications

References

Barenaked Ladies albums
1996 live albums
Reprise Records live albums
Albums produced by Michael Phillip Wojewoda